Valletto may refer to:

Dan Valletto, American darts player
Monte Valletto, mountain in Italy